Richard Jones is a British music producer, songwriter, bass guitar player and founding member of the rock band The Feeling.

Career
Jones attended the BRIT School in Croydon. He cites Paul McCartney and John Deacon among his influences. He also admires Jaco Pastorius and James Jamerson for their "technicality".

Prior to The Feeling signing to Island records in 2005 Jones worked primarily as a session bass guitarist and toured as a member of Sophie Ellis-Bextor's band in 2001–2003 to promote her 2001 album Read My Lips.  An April 2002 concert from Shepherd's Bush Empire featuring Jones was released on DVD as Watch My Lips. He also appears frequently on a bonus feature on the DVD, a video diary about life on the road during the tour. Since then Jones has played bass on all of Ellis-Bextor's studio albums and on many tours in between work with the Feeling.

As a member of The Feeling, Jones won Songwriter of the Year in 2007 at the Ivor Novello Awards.

In 2010 Jones co-founded and curated the Little World music festival held 2010/11 in Meribel, France

He performed in the closing ceremony of the 2012 Olympic Games on 12 August 2012 with Ed Sheeran, Nick Mason and Mike Rutherford.

During 2016-17 Jones joined Bryan Adams band on bass guitar duties during his Get Up tour as cover for long term bassist Norm Fischer.

in 2018 Ed Harcourt and Jones co-organised a fundraising concert to help raise funds to save the All Star Boxing gym in Queen's Park from closure

in 2019 Richard played bass guitar as part of the band for the 'A Not So Silent Night' Christmas concerts in Dublin and London with Rufus Wainwright, Martha Wainwright, Chrissie Hynde, Guy Garvey and Neil Tennant which were held to benefit the Kate McGarrigle fund.

In 2019 Jones announced the formation of new group Loup Garoux with long-term collaborator and friend Ed Harcourt and drummer of Senseless Things and Gorillaz, Cass Browne. The band played their first live dates supporting Supergrass in March 2020.

Jones put together the CarFest Supergroup, on behalf of Virgin radio DJ Chris Evans, who released a live double album for the anniversary of Evans' music and motoring festival with the profits going to a number of charities including the Teenage Cancer Trust and the Starlight Children's Foundation. Vocalists/musicians on the album include Sophie Ellis-Bextor, Roger Daltrey, KT Tunstall, Gary Kemp and Ricky Wilson.

In 2020, during the COVID-19 pandemic Jones and his wife Sophie Ellis-Bextor broadcast live weekly "Kitchen Disco" concerts featuring herself and her family, streamed live from their kitchen on Instagram. According to Sophie, Jones came up with the concept and also films, edits and deals with the technical aspects of the broadcasts as well as appearing wearing animal masks

Personal life
Jones married British pop star Sophie Ellis-Bextor on 25 June 2005 in Italy. Jones has said "something kind of smacked us in the face. The chemistry was incredible – it was like nothing I've ever experienced", Their first baby was born, two months early, only eight months after they started going out together.

Jones mentioned in a 2011 Flaps Podcast that he was learning to fly. He also talks about obtaining his private pilot's licence and his passion for flying in an interview for Pilot magazine in 2013. Nick Mason drummer of Pink Floyd and Richard discuss their friendship and flying together in a profile piece for the independent in 2013

As of 2019 Sophie and Richard live in West London and have 5 children

References

English rock bass guitarists
Male bass guitarists
People educated at the BRIT School
People from Forest Row
Living people
Sophie Ellis-Bextor
1979 births